Otterburne is a small settlement in the Rural Municipality of De Salaberry, Manitoba, located about 50 kilometers south of Winnipeg. It is named after Otterburn, Northumberland in England, and is the location of Providence University College and Theological Seminary. 

On 30 July 2005, a wind storm reaching speeds of over 150 km/h ripped through the Otterburne area, destroying trees, damaging buildings, and picking up irrigation wheels which weighed over 15 tonnes. Eyewitnesses reported that they had seen a tornado.

References

External links
ePodunk file
Reference by the Providence College and Theological Seminary

Localities in Manitoba

Unincorporated communities in Eastman Region, Manitoba